This was the first edition of the men's doubles tournament.

Tristan Lamasine and Franko Škugor won the title, defeating Jarryd Chaplin and John-Patrick Smith 6–3, 6–1 in the final.

Seeds

Draw

References
Main Draw

Challenger Banque Nationale de Gatineau
Challenger de Gatineau